The 2011–12 Murray State Racers men's basketball team represented Murray State University during the 2011–12 NCAA Division I men's basketball season. The Racers, led by first year head coach Steve Prohm, played their home games at the CFSB Center and were members of the Ohio Valley Conference. They were the Ohio Valley regular season champions and champions of the 2012 OVC Basketball tournament to earn the conference's automatic bid into the 2012 NCAA tournament. This was the Racers 15th tournament appearance. They defeated Colorado State in the second round before falling to Marquette in the third round to finish the season 31-2.

Roster

 Dexter Fields was ineligible this season under NCAA rules as a transfer. After this season, he had two years of eligibility remaining

Schedule

|-
!colspan=9| Exhibition

|-
!colspan=9| Regular season

|-
!colspan=9| 2012 OVC Basketball tournament

|-
!colspan=9| 2012 NCAA tournament

Rankings

References

Murray State Racers men's basketball seasons
Murray State
Murray State
Murray State Racers men's basketball
Murray State Racers men's basketball